Deborah Grant (born 1968) is a Canadian-born African-American artist noted for her work in painting and collage, particularly for her series "Random Select". She lives and works in Harlem, New York.

Early life and education 
Grant was born in Toronto, Canada, in 1968, and spent the first four years of her life in Canada. She was raised Catholic and on occasion created Catholic shrines in the abandoned lots of Brooklyn with her brother. Grant received a Bachelor of Fine Arts (BFA) in painting from Columbia College Chicago in 1996. She received a Master of Fine Arts (MFA) from Tyler School of Art in 1999. After completing her MFA, Grant completed a summer residency at Skowhagen School of Painting and Sculpture in Skowhagen, Maine. From 2002-2003, she was an artist-in-residence at the Studio Museum in Harlem.

Work 
Grant's works feature fabulist narratives in painting and drawing. Amalgamating images from a variety of sources, ranging from comics to art historical reference books, she creates imagistic stories that investigate cultural identity, race and politics. Ranging from explosive flurries of color and collage to simpler compositions that address singular concepts, Grant explores within her work: "...[T]he idea of constant information bombardment or the chaos in the back of our minds juxtaposed with what is happening physically in front of us."

Awards and fellowships 
Deborah Grant was awarded the William H. Johnson Prize in 2011.

Selected exhibitions 
Grant's work has been featured in exhibitions at numerous galleries and institutions including:
 The Drawing Center, New York, USA Christ You Know it Ain't Easy!! (2014)
Institute for Research in Art at the University of South Florida, Florida, USA Making Sense (2014)
 Berkeley Art Museum, Berkeley, USA Deborah Grant: Bacon, Egg, Toast in Lard (2009)
 Contemporary Arts Museum, Houston, USA The Old Weird America (2008)
 P.S.1 Contemporary Art Center, New York, USA Emergency Room Show (2007)
 Alexandre Pollazzon Ltd, London, United Kingdom Welcome To My World (2007)
 Esso Gallery, New York, USA Arte Povera Now and Then (2007)
 University of Arkansas, Little Rock, USA Taking Possession (2007)
 Roebling Hall, New York, USA a gin cure (2006)
 Steve Turner Gallery, Beverly Hills, USA a gin cure (2006)
 The Studio Museum in Harlem, New York, USA Freestyle (2001)
 Santa Monica Museum of Art, Santa Monica, USA Freestyle (2001)

Collections 
Grant's work is held in permanent collections including:
 In the Land of the Blind the Blue Eye Man is King, 2007, Nasher Museum of Art, Durham, USA

References

External links 

Deborah Grant at Steve Turner

1968 births
African-American contemporary artists
American contemporary artists
American contemporary painters
American women artists
Living people
African-American painters
21st-century African-American artists
21st-century African-American women
20th-century African-American artists
20th-century African-American women
20th-century African-American people
African-American Catholics